Polly Samson (born 29 April 1962) is an English novelist, lyricist and journalist. She is married to the musician David Gilmour and has written the lyrics to many of Gilmour's songs, both as a solo artist and with his group Pink Floyd.

Life and career
Samson's father was Lance Samson (died 4 February 2013), a newspaper editor and diplomatic correspondent for the Morning Star. Her mother was a writer of Chinese descent, Esther Cheo Ying, who wrote a memoir, Black Country to Red China, about her time serving as a Major in Mao Zedong's Red Army. Samson's mother's second husband was the British journalist Alan Winnington.

Following a troubled childhood, Samson joined the publishing industry, through which she met the writer Heathcote Williams with whom she became romantically involved during the publication of his book-length poem Whale Nation (1988). Samson was responsible for publicising what became a best-selling volume, despite its author's reluctance to promote his own work. With Williams she had her first son, Charlie. Following his birth, Samson became homeless and was taken in for a period by the journalist Cassandra Jardine.

After splitting from Williams, Samson met the Pink Floyd singer and guitarist David Gilmour, whom she married in 1994 during Pink Floyd's Division Bell tour. Her son Charlie was adopted by Gilmour and they have three other children: Joe, Gabriel, and Romany.

Samson has written short stories for BBC Radio 4 and has had a collection published Lying in Bed (Virago 1999) and a novel, Out of the Picture (Virago 2000), as well as contributing pieces and stories to many other books and publications including Gas and Air (Bloomsbury 2003), Girls Night In (Harper Collins 2000), A Day in the Life (Black Swan 2003), and The Just When Stories (Beautiful Books 2010). Samson's collection of stories, Perfect Lives, was published in November 2010 by Virago Press. Her novel The Kindness was published in 2015.

Samson is credited as a co-writer on seven of The Division Bells 11 tracks, and, with the retrospective credit given to Clare Torry for her vocals on "The Great Gig in the Sky", she is one of only two female co-writers of any Pink Floyd songs. She also wrote lyrics for Gilmour's 2006 album, On an Island, and made a guest appearance on piano and vocals. She contributed lyrics to "Louder than Words", the only track on Pink Floyd's 2014 release, The Endless River, to contain any sung lyrics. Samson has also contributed lyrics to half of the tracks on Gilmour's latest album, Rattle That Lock (2015), some of which were inspired by Paradise Lost, an epic poem by John Milton.

In 2018, Samson was made a Fellow of the Royal Society of Literature.

Samson's novel, A Theatre For Dreamers, was published on 2 April 2020 by Bloomsbury Circus. The novel entered the Sunday Times Bestsellers Chart at number two.

On February 6, 2023. Samson tweeted to musician Roger Waters: "Sadly you are antisemitic to your rotten core. Also a Putin apologist and a lying, thieving, hypocritical, tax-avoiding, lip-synching, misogynistic, sick-with-envy, megalomaniac.” Her husband David Gilmour followed up by writing: "Every word demonstrably true."

Works

 Lying in Bed – Virago Press Ltd, 2000; 
 Out of the Picture – Virago Press Ltd, 2001; 
 Perfect Lives – Virago Press Ltd, 2010; 
 The Kindness – Bloomsbury Publishing, 2015; 
 A Theatre For Dreamers – Bloomsbury Circus, 2020;

References

External links
 Official website

1962 births
Living people
David Gilmour
Writers from London
English women journalists
English writers
English people of Chinese descent
English women novelists